Juan E. Gilbert (born February 27, 1969) is an American computer scientist, researcher, inventor, and educator. An advocate of diversity in the computing sciences, Gilbert's efforts to increase the number of underrepresented minorities in the computing disciplines have been recognized by professional engineering organizations and the United States government.

Gilbert was awarded the first Presidential Endowed Chair at Clemson University on November 9, 2012.  According to one author, Gilbert's efforts "in large part" in 2012 led Clemson to have 10 percent African American computer science professors, and 10 percent of the African American computer science doctoral students in the United States.

Education 
Ph.D., University of Cincinnati, Cincinnati, Ohio, 2000 (Computer Science); dissertation: "Arthur: An Intelligent Tutoring System with Adaptive Instruction"

Honors and awards (selected) 
 Computing Research Association's A. Nico Habermann Award, 2018.
 Named one of Ten Tech Innovators by The Chronicle of Higher Education, 2013.
 Richard A. Tapia Achievement Award for Scientific Scholarship, Civic Science, and Diversifying Computing, 2013.
 Federal Communications Commission (FCC) Chairman's Award for Advancement in Accessibility, 2012.
 Named one of the 2012 The Root 100 Black Influencers and Achievers.
 National Center for Women & Information Technology (NCWIT) Undergraduate Research Mentoring Award, 2012.
 Hamilton, Ohio Booker T. Washington Community Center Academic Excellence Award, 2012.
 Miami University Bishop Medal Alumni Award, 2012.
 February 2012 Named “Dr. Juan Gilbert Month” by Hamilton, Ohio City Council.
 Recipient of the Hamilton, Ohio City Council Key to the City, 2012.
 Council for Advancement and Support of Education (CASE) District III Grand Award Winner for Audiovisual Communication, “ Prime III: The world’s first all-accessible, electronic voting system”, 2012.
 Recipient of the Presidential Award for Excellence in Science, Mathematics, and Engineering Mentoring, National Science Foundation.
 Clemson University Board of Trustees 2011 Award for Faculty Excellence.
 Fellow, American Association for the Advancement of Science (AAAS), 2011–present.
 ACM Distinguished Scientist, 2010–present.
 Named 1 of the 50 Most Important African Americans in Technology, 2008–2013.
 Fellow, African Scientific Institute (ASI), 2011–present.
 Academic Keys Who's Who in Sciences Academia.
 Clemson University Board of Trustees 2010 Award for Faculty Excellence.

References

External links 

 "HXR Lab", The Human-Experience Research Lab at the University of Florida.
 "Juan E. Gilbert, Ph.D.", Juan E. Gilbert, Ph.D., home page.
 "Prime III", Prime III: One Machine, One Vote for Everyone.
 "Virtual Traffic Stop", The Virtual Traffic Stop.
 "AADMLSS", African-American Distributed Multiple Learning Styles System. 
 "Applications Quest, LLC", Applications Quest, LLC.

1969 births
Living people
21st-century scholars
20th-century scholars
African-American academics
African-American inventors
African-American computer scientists
American computer scientists
Clemson University faculty
University of Cincinnati alumni
Miami University alumni
Fellows of the American Association for the Advancement of Science
Fellows of the Association for Computing Machinery
People from Hamilton, Ohio
Engineers from Ohio
21st-century American inventors
21st-century African-American people
20th-century African-American people